"Hanging Around" is a song by English rock band the Stranglers,  released on their debut album Rattus Norvegicus.

Composition and release
The song grew out of a bass line by Jean-Jacques Burnel to which Hugh Cornwell added lyrics. The lyrics were inspired by people who used to 'hang around' the London clubs, particularly the Nashville, where the band used to perform. The first verse focuses on "a woman in red who was always there getting drunk and passing out, which [according to Cornwell] used to make us laugh". The second verse makes reference to Earl's Court Road near the Nashville where drug hustlers hung about. The third verse refers to "a friend of ours called Garry Coward-Williams, who was always smiling, and a friend of his we called Duncan Doughnuts, who was 20 going on 40. I could never believe how old he looked. His whole manner and appearance was of a middle-aged man". For the fourth verse, Cornwell had run out of ideas, so Burnel provided the lyrics for it, which refer to the Coleherne, a gay pub that he used to frequent.

The chorus mentions Jesus Christ, about which Cornwell has said:

There was a possibility that "Hanging Around" could have been released as the band's third single. However, their second album, No More Heroes, was released five months after Rattus Norvegicus in September 1977 and "it wouldn't have made marketing sense to release a single from one album, when a new album was coming out immediately afterwards". Instead, "Something Better Change" was released in July 1977 as their third single and first from No More Heroes.

Personnel
 Hugh Cornwell – lead vocals, lead and rhythm guitar
 Jean-Jacques Burnel – backing vocals, bass guitar
 Dave Greenfield – Hammond organ, Hohner electric piano
 Jet Black – drums

Hazel O'Connor version

In September 1981, British singer Hazel O'Connor released a cover of the song as a single from her second studio album Cover Plus. It peaked at number 45 on the UK Singles Chart.

Reception
Reviewing for Smash Hits, Ian Birch wrote "Hazel always treats her songs like showbiz productions. You might almost see the stage set here (city streets and distant neon). The orchestra bound into a fat rhythm. There's some sweaty sax for atmosphere and some synthesiser for modernity. Hazel performs a show-stopper while a male chorus sellotape on back-up vocals". When reviewing Cover Plus for Record Mirror, Simon Tebbutt described "Hanging Around" as "a curiously watered down version with little of the raunch of the original".

Track listings
7" (UK)
 "Hanging Around" – 3:05
 "Hold On" – 4:26
 "Not for You" (German Version) – 2:44

7" (Europe & Australia)
 "Hanging Around" – 3:05
 "Hold On" – 4:26

Personnel
 Hazel O'Connor – vocals
 Neil O'Connor – guitar, backing vocals
 Andy 'Roots' Qunta – keyboards, backing vocals
 Steve Kinch – bass guitar, backing vocals
 Wesley Magoogan – saxophone, lyricon, backing vocals
 Eddie Case – drums, backing vocals

Charts

References

1977 songs
The Stranglers songs
Songs written by Hugh Cornwell
Songs written by Jean-Jacques Burnel
Songs written by Dave Greenfield
Songs written by Jet Black
Song recordings produced by Martin Rushent
1981 singles
Hazel O'Connor songs
Song recordings produced by Tony Visconti